is a private junior college in Nishinomiya, Hyōgo, Japan.

History 
The school was founded in 1939 as a school under the name . It was chartered as a college in 1950. In 1985, the name of the junior college was changed to the present one. This junior college consists of seven academic departments. This number is the most for Japanese junior colleges at the present time.

References

External links 
 

Educational institutions established in 1950
Private universities and colleges in Japan
Japanese junior colleges
Universities and colleges in Hyōgo Prefecture
1950 establishments in Japan